The 2008–09 Los Angeles Clippers season was the 39th season of the franchise in the National Basketball Association (NBA).  This season marks the team's 25th season in the city of Los Angeles.

Key dates
 June 26: The 2008 NBA draft took place in New York City.
 July 1: The free agency period started.

Draft picks

Roster

Roster Notes
 This is Jason Hart's second tour of duty with the franchise.  He previously played for the team in 2006–2007.
 This is also Brian Skinner's second tour of duty with the franchise as well.  He previously played for the team from 1998 to 2001.

Regular season

Standings

Record vs. opponents

Game log

|- bgcolor="#ffcccc"
| 1
| October 29
| L.A. Lakers
| 
| Al Thornton (16)
| Tim Thomas (8)
| Baron Davis (7)
| Staples Center19,060
| 0–1
|- bgcolor="#ffcccc"
| 2
| October 31
| Denver
| 
| Al Thornton (30)
| Chris Kaman (15)
| Cuttino Mobley, Mike Taylor (3)
| Staples Center11,418
| 0–2

|- bgcolor="#ffcccc"
| 3
| November 1
| @ Utah
| 
| Cuttino Mobley (20)
| Chris Kaman (12)
| Mike Taylor (4)
| EnergySolutions Arena19,602
| 0–3
|- bgcolor="#ffcccc"
| 4
| November 3
| Utah
| 
| Chris Kaman (19)
| Chris Kaman (10)
| Baron Davis (9)
| Staples Center12,712
| 0–4
|- bgcolor="#ffcccc"
| 5
| November 5
| @ L.A. Lakers
| 
| Al Thornton (22)
| Tim Thomas, Chris Kaman (11)
| Baron Davis (7)
| Staples Center18,997
| 0–5
|- bgcolor="#ffcccc"
| 6
| November 7
| Houston
| 
| Baron Davis, Chris Kaman (23)
| Marcus Camby (13)
| Baron Davis (8)
| Staples Center14,670
| 0–6
|- bgcolor="#bbffbb"
| 7
| November 9
| Dallas
| 
| Baron Davis (22)
| Marcus Camby (14)
| Baron Davis (10)
| Staples Center14,249
| 1–6
|- bgcolor="#ffcccc"
| 8
| November 12
| Sacramento
| 
| Al Thornton (20)
| Chris Kaman (6)
| Baron Davis (11)
| Staples Center13,266
| 1–7
|- bgcolor="#ffcccc"
| 9
| November 15
| Golden State
| 
| Baron Davis (25)
| Chris Kaman (13)
| Baron Davis (11)
| Staples Center12,823
| 1–8
|- bgcolor="#ffcccc"
| 10
| November 17
| San Antonio
| 
| Cuttino Mobley (18)
| Chris Kaman (13)
| Baron Davis (8)
| Staples Center14,962
| 1–9
|- bgcolor="#bbffbb"
| 11
| November 19
| @ Oklahoma City
| 
| Chris Kaman (25)
| Chris Kaman (14)
| Baron Davis (8)
| Ford Center18,312
| 2–9
|- bgcolor="#ffcccc"
| 12
| November 21
| @ Philadelphia
| 
| Al Thornton (22)
| Al Thornton, Chris Kaman, Marcus Camby (9)
| Baron Davis (6)
| Wachovia Center13,474
| 2–10
|- bgcolor="#ffcccc"
| 13
| November 22
| @ New Jersey
| 
| Baron Davis (30)
| Marcus Camby (13)
| Baron Davis (10)
| Izod Center17,677
| 2–11
|- bgcolor="#ffcccc"
| 14
| November 24
| New Orleans
| 
| Eric Gordon (25)
| Marcus Camby (11)
| Baron Davis (8)
| Staples Center14,956
| 2–12
|- bgcolor="#ffcccc"
| 15
| November 26
| Denver
| 
| Eric Gordon (24)
| Marcus Camby (11)
| Baron Davis (10)
| Staples Center14,934
| 2–13
|- bgcolor="#bbffbb"
| 16
| November 29
| Miami
| 
| Al Thornton, Zach Randolph (27)
| Zach Randolph (13)
| Baron Davis (9)
| Staples Center16,245
| 3–13

|- bgcolor="#ffcccc"
| 17
| December 2
| @ Dallas
| 
| Zach Randolph (27)
| Marcus Camby (15)
| Baron Davis (6)
| American Airlines Center19,670
| 3–14
|- bgcolor="#ffcccc"
| 18
| December 3
| @ Houston
| 
| Al Thornton (24)
| Zach Randolph, Marcus Camby (11)
| Baron Davis (9)
| Toyota Center15,358
| 3–15
|- bgcolor="#ffcccc"
| 19
| December 5
| @ Memphis
| 
| Baron Davis (23)
| Marcus Camby (10)
| Baron Davis (8)
| FedExForum10,484
| 3–16
|- bgcolor="#bbffbb"
| 20
| December 6
| @ Minnesota
| 
| Baron Davis (27)
| Marcus Camby (19)
| Baron Davis (9)
| Target Center10,863
| 4–16
|- bgcolor="#ffcccc"
| 21
| December 8
| Orlando
| 
| Baron Davis (27)
| Marcus Camby (17)
| Baron Davis (7)
| Staples Center15,222
| 4–17
|- bgcolor="#bbffbb"
| 22
| December 12
| @ Portland
| 
| Zach Randolph (38)
| Marcus Camby (13)
| Baron Davis (6)
| Rose Garden20,558
| 5–17
|- bgcolor="#bbffbb"
| 23
| December 13
| Houston
| 
| Zach Randolph (30)
| Zach Randolph, Marcus Camby (13)
| Baron Davis (9)
| Staples Center16,203
| 6–17
|- bgcolor="#bbffbb"
| 24
| December 16
| @ Oklahoma City
| 
| Eric Gordon, Zach Randolph (22)
| Marcus Camby (15)
| Baron Davis (7)
| Ford Center18,275
| 7–17
|- bgcolor="#ffcccc"
| 25
| December 17
| @ Chicago
| 
| Zach Randolph (30)
| Marcus Camby (27)
| Baron Davis (12)
| United Center20,102
| 7–18
|- bgcolor="#bbffbb"
| 26
| December 19
| @ Indiana
| 
| Zach Randolph (34)
| Zach Randolph (16)
| Baron Davis (11)
| Conseco Fieldhouse12,653
| 8–18
|- bgcolor="#ffcccc"
| 27
| December 20
| @ Milwaukee
| 
| Al Thornton (20)
| Marcus Camby (11)
| Jason Hart (7)
| Bradley Center15,014
| 8–19
|- bgcolor="#ffcccc"
| 28
| December 22
| Toronto
| 
| Eric Gordon, Zach Randolph (19)
| Al Thornton (9)
| Baron Davis (9)
| Staples Center16,094
| 8–20
|- bgcolor="#ffcccc"
| 29
| December 28
| Dallas
| 
| Al Thornton, Marcus Camby (16)
| Marcus Camby (12)
| Baron Davis (9)
| Staples Center16,685
| 8–21
|- bgcolor="#ffcccc"
| 30
| December 30
| @ Sacramento
| 
| Eric Gordon (24)
| Marcus Camby (24)
| Marcus Camby, Baron Davis (4)
| ARCO Arena11,420
| 8–22
|- bgcolor="#ffcccc"
| 31
| December 31
| Philadelphia
| 
| Al Thornton (24)
| Marcus Camby (17)
| Baron Davis (8)
| Staples Center14,021
| 8–23

|- bgcolor="#ffcccc"
| 32
| January 2
| @ Phoenix
| 
| Eric Gordon (21)
| Marcus Camby (23)
| Fred Jones, Marcus Camby (4)
| US Airways Center18,422
| 8–24
|- bgcolor="#ffcccc"
| 33
| January 4
| Detroit
| 
| Eric Gordon (31)
| Marcus Camby (20)
| Mardy Collins (12)
| Staples Center17,968
| 8–25
|- bgcolor="#ffcccc"
| 34
| January 6
| @ Dallas
| 
| Eric Gordon (32)
| Marcus Camby (19)
| Eric Gordon (6)
| American Airlines Center19,794
| 8–26
|- bgcolor="#ffcccc"
| 35
| January 8
| @ San Antonio
| 
| Al Thornton, Eric Gordon (21)
| Marcus Camby (9)
| Jason Hart (4)
| AT&T Center17,873
| 8–27
|- bgcolor="#ffcccc"
| 36
| January 9
| @ New Orleans
| 
| Eric Gordon, Mardy Collins (15)
| Marcus Camby (17)
| Mardy Collins (6)
| New Orleans Arena17,815
| 8–28
|- bgcolor="#ffcccc"
| 37
| January 11
| Phoenix
| 
| Al Thornton (23)
| Marcus Camby (18)
| Fred Jones (10)
| Staples Center17,307
| 8–29
|- bgcolor="#ffcccc"
| 38
| January 14
| Atlanta
| 
| Al Thornton (25)
| Marcus Camby (18)
| Mardy Collins (8)
| Staples Center15,901
| 8–30
|- bgcolor="#bbffbb"
| 39
| January 17
| Milwaukee
| 
| Brian Skinner, Marcus Camby (18)
| Marcus Camby (11)
| Mardy Collins (11)
| Staples Center16,448
| 9–30
|- bgcolor="#ffcccc"
| 40
| January 19
| Minnesota
| 
| Eric Gordon (25)
| DeAndre Jordan (10)
| Mardy Collins (8)
| Staples Center14,399
| 9–31
|- bgcolor="#ffcccc"
| 41
| January 21
| L.A. Lakers
| 
| DeAndre Jordan (23)
| DeAndre Jordan (12)
| Eric Gordon (6)
| Staples Center19,627
| 9–32
|- bgcolor="#bbffbb"
| 42
| January 23
| Oklahoma City
| 
| Eric Gordon (41)
| Cheikh Samb (8)
| Ricky Davis (11)
| Staples Center14,913
| 10–32
|- bgcolor="#ffcccc"
| 43
| January 25
| @ Golden State
| 
| Eric Gordon (21)
| DeAndre Jordan (20)
| Ricky Davis (7)
| Oracle Arena17,746
| 10–33
|- bgcolor="#ffcccc"
| 44
| January 26
| Portland
| 
| Al Thornton (23)
| Brian Skinner (10)
| Fred Jones, Eric Gordon (7)
| Staples Center16,570
| 10–34
|- bgcolor="#ffcccc"
| 45
| January 28
| Chicago
| 
| Eric Gordon (19)
| Al Thornton, DeAndre Jordan, Marcus Camby (6)
| Eric Gordon (7)
| Staples Center15,637
| 10–35
|- bgcolor="#ffcccc"
| 46
| January 30
| @ Cleveland
| 
| Eric Gordon (27)
| Eric Gordon, Baron Davis (7)
| Fred Jones (9)
| Quicken Loans Arena20,562
| 10–36
|- bgcolor="#ffcccc"
| 47
| January 31
| @ Washington
| 
| Eric Gordon (25)
| Brian Skinner (10)
| Baron Davis, Fred Jones (6)
| Verizon Center18,227
| 10–37

|- bgcolor="#ffcccc"
| 48
| February 2
| @ Miami
| 
| Zach Randolph (21)
| Al Thornton, Marcus Camby (7)
| Baron Davis (9)
| American Airlines Arena15,985
| 10–38
|- bgcolor="#ffcccc"
| 49
| February 4
| @ Orlando
| 
| Al Thornton (27)
| Marcus Camby (9)
| Fred Jones (6)
| Amway Arena16,101
| 10–39
|- bgcolor="#bbffbb"
| 50
| February 6
| @ Memphis
| 
| Zach Randolph (35)
| Marcus Camby (11)
| Baron Davis (8)
| FedExForum10,912
| 11–39
|- bgcolor="#bbffbb"
| 51
| February 7
| @ Atlanta
| 
| Al Thornton (31)
| Zach Randolph (9)
| Fred Jones (9)
| Philips Arena18,729
| 12–39
|- bgcolor="#ffcccc"
| 52
| February 9
| @ Charlotte
| 
| Zach Randolph (20)
| Marcus Camby (11)
| Baron Davis (8)
| Time Warner Cable Arena10,852
| 12–40
|- bgcolor="#bbffbb"
| 53
| February 11
| New York
| 
| Eric Gordon (30)
| Zach Randolph (15)
| Baron Davis (20)
| Staples Center16,928
| 13–40
|- bgcolor="#ffcccc"
| 54
| February 17
| @ Phoenix
| 
| Eric Gordon (24)
| DeAndre Jordan (7)
| Baron Davis (6)
| US Airways Center18,422
| 13–41
|- bgcolor="#ffcccc"
| 55
| February 18
| Phoenix
| 
| Al Thornton (33)
| DeAndre Jordan (11)
| Baron Davis (7)
| Staples Center18,169
| 13–42
|- bgcolor="#ffcccc"
| 56
| February 22
| @ Portland
| 
| Eric Gordon (21)
| DeAndre Jordan (12)
| Baron Davis (6)
| Rose Garden20,447
| 13–43
|- bgcolor="#bbffbb"
| 57
| February 23
| Golden State
| 
| Zach Randolph, Eric Gordon (27)
| Zach Randolph (11)
| Baron Davis (10)
| Staples Center15,383
| 14–43
|- bgcolor="#bbffbb"
| 58
| February 25
| Boston
| 
| Zach Randolph (30)
| Zach Randolph (12)
| Mardy Collins, Baron Davis (5)
| Staples Center18,609
| 15–43
|- bgcolor="#ffcccc"
| 59
| February 27
| @ Sacramento
| 
| Steve Novak, Baron Davis (13)
| Marcus Camby (13)
| Mike Taylor (5)
| ARCO Arena12,846
| 15–44
|- bgcolor="#ffcccc"
| 60
| February 28
| Charlotte
| 
| Zach Randolph (33)
| Marcus Camby (13)
| Baron Davis, Ricky Davis (6)
| Staples Center16,349
| 15–45

|- bgcolor="#ffcccc"
| 61
| March 2
| San Antonio
| 
| Fred Jones, Al Thornton (14)
| Mike Taylor, Marcus Camby (8)
| Baron Davis (8)
| Staples Center17,649
| 15–46
|- bgcolor="#ffcccc"
| 62
| March 4
| Memphis
| 
| Al Thornton (25)
| DeAndre Jordan (9)
| Baron Davis (7)
| Staples Center13,813
| 15–47
|- bgcolor="#ffcccc"
| 63
| March 7
| Indiana
| 
| Eric Gordon (35)
| DeAndre Jordan (11)
| Eric Gordon (6)
| Staples Center16,518
| 15–48
|- bgcolor="#ffcccc"
| 64
| March 10
| Cleveland
| 
| Al Thornton, Zach Randolph (20)
| Zach Randolph (12)
| Baron Davis, Zach Randolph (6)
| Staples Center19,060
| 15–49
|- bgcolor="#ffcccc"
| 65
| March 14
| @ Denver
| 
| Al Thornton (19)
| Al Thornton, Marcus Camby, Chris Kaman (7)
| Baron Davis (10)
| Pepsi Center18,676
| 15–50
|- bgcolor="#bbffbb"
| 66
| March 15
| New Jersey
| 
| Steve Novak (21)
| Al Thornton, Chris Kaman (8)
| Baron Davis (10)
| Staples Center18,266
| 16–50
|- bgcolor="#ffcccc"
| 67
| March 17
| @ Golden State
| 
| Baron Davis (29)
| Zach Randolph, Marcus Camby (11)
| Baron Davis (7)
| Oracle Arena18,223
| 16–51
|- bgcolor="#bbffbb"
| 68
| March 18
| Washington
| 
| Eric Gordon (26)
| Baron Davis, Zach Randolph (8)
| Baron Davis (20)
| Staples Center15,123
| 17–51
|- bgcolor="#ffcccc"
| 69
| March 20
| @ Detroit
| 
| Eric Gordon (22)
| Chris Kaman (8)
| Baron Davis (8)
| The Palace of Auburn Hills22,076
| 17–52
|- bgcolor="#ffcccc"
| 70
| March 22
| @ Toronto
| 
| Zach Randolph (20)
| Zach Randolph, Marcus Camby (7)
| Baron Davis (4)
| Air Canada Centre17,610
| 17–53
|- bgcolor="#ffcccc"
| 71
| March 23
| @ Boston
| 
| Zach Randolph (17)
| Zach Randolph (14)
| Baron Davis (8)
| TD Banknorth Garden18,624
| 17–54
|- bgcolor="#bbffbb"
| 72
| March 25
| @ New York
| 
| Mike Taylor (35)
| Al Thornton (9)
| Baron Davis (6)
| Madison Square Garden19,041
| 18–54
|- bgcolor="#ffcccc"
| 73
| March 27
| @ San Antonio
| 
| Mike Taylor (23)
| Alex Acker (8)
| Eric Gordon (4)
| AT&T Center18,797
| 18–55
|- bgcolor="#ffcccc"
| 74
| March 28
| @ Houston
| 
| Eric Gordon (17)
| Zach Randolph (8)
| Mike Taylor (6)
| Toyota Center18,267
| 18–56

|- bgcolor="#ffcccc"
| 75
| April 1
| New Orleans
| 
| Eric Gordon (25)
| Zach Randolph (14)
| Baron Davis (12)
| Staples Center19,060
| 18–57
|- bgcolor="#ffcccc"
| 76
| April 4
| @ Denver
| 
| Zach Randolph (22)
| Zach Randolph (12)
| Baron Davis (8)
| Pepsi Center17,880
| 18–58
|- bgcolor="#ffcccc"
| 77
| April 5
| @ L.A. Lakers
| 
| Eric Gordon (24)
| Brian Skinner (13)
| Eric Gordon (4)
| Staples Center18,997
| 18–59
|- bgcolor="#ffcccc"
| 78
| April 7
| Minnesota
| 
| Eric Gordon (28)
| Brian Skinner (14)
| Fred Jones (7)
| Staples Center16,757
| 18–60
|- bgcolor="#bbffbb"
| 79
| April 10
| Sacramento
| 
| Brian Skinner (21)
| Chris Kaman (13)
| Baron Davis (5)
| Staples Center18,232
| 19–60
|- bgcolor="#ffcccc"
| 80
| April 11
| Portland
| 
| Eric Gordon (18)
| Chris Kaman (8)
| Fred Jones (5)
| Staples Center18,321
| 19–61
|- bgcolor="#ffcccc"
| 81
| April 13
| @ Utah
| 
| Marcus Camby (17)
| DeAndre Jordan (11)
| Baron Davis (7)
| EnergySolutions Arena19,911
| 19–62
|-bgcolor="#ffcccc"
| 82
| April 15
| Oklahoma City
| 
| Eric Gordon (22)
| Marcus Camby (7)
| Baron Davis, Fred Jones (5)
| Staples Center19,060
| 19–63

Transactions

Trades

Free agents

Additions

Subtractions

References

Los Angeles Clippers seasons
Los Angeles Clippers